Penegephyrosaurus is an extinct genus of early rhynchocephalian from the Late Triassic of the United Kingdom. It contains a single species, Penegephyrosaurus curtiscoppi.

References 

Sphenodontia
Prehistoric reptile genera